The Patoka River (Pronounced, PaTohKah) is a  tributary of the Wabash River in southwestern Indiana in the United States. It drains a largely rural area of forested bottomland and agricultural lands among the hills north of Evansville.

Description
It flows generally west, passing through Patoka Lake, where it is impounded for flood control. Downstream from the reservoir it flows in a highly meandering course, making large oxbows as it flows past sharp hilly terrain as it approaches Jasper, then westward across Pike and Gibson counties, passing through more sharp terrain.

At Princeton, Indiana, the Patoka has a mean annual discharge of approximately 1,082 cubic feet per second.

The river once included highly diverse habitat that supported mussel, crayfish, and fish communities. A 1994 survey of 66 locations on the river concluded that about a third of the streams in the river's watershed were devoid of aquatic life . The decline in aquatic life is believed by most biologists to be a result of acidic runoff from strip mining, as well as spills and contamination from petroleum and natural gas exploration in its watershed. The remaining freshwater crayfish population of the river comprises four extant species, including the principal population of the Indiana crayfish (Orconectes indianensis). The refuge contains one of the most significant bottomland hardwood forests remaining in the state.

Patoka Lake is a major recreational destination in the region and includes four state parks along its shore.

The river's name comes from an Indian word meaning "log on bottom".

Crawford, Dubois, Gibson, and Pike counties each have a township named for the river.

See also
List of rivers of Indiana

References

External links
USFWS: Patoka River Wildlife Refuge
Indiana University: Patoka River

Rivers of Indiana
Tributaries of the Wabash River
Rivers of Orange County, Indiana
Rivers of Dubois County, Indiana
Rivers of Pike County, Indiana
Rivers of Gibson County, Indiana
Rivers of Wabash County, Indiana
Rivers of Crawford County, Indiana